Paradrillia minoensis is an extinct species of sea snail, a marine gastropod mollusk in the family Horaiclavidae.

Description

Distribution
This marine species occurs off Japan.

References

External links
 Japan Paleobiology Database:  Clavatula (Paradrillia) minoensis 

minoensis
Gastropods described in 1961